Qumis (Middle Persian 𐭪𐭥𐭬𐭩𐭮 Kōmis), also known as Hecatompylos (in , Saddarvazeh) was an ancient city which was the capital of the Arsacid dynasty by 200 BCE. The Greek name Hekatompylos means "one hundred gates" and the Persian term has the same meaning. The title was commonly used for cities which had more than the traditional four gates. It may be understood better as the "Many Gated". Most scholars locate it at Sahr -e Qumis, in the Qumis region in west Khurasan, Iran.

Alexander the Great stopped here in the summer of 330 BCE and it became part of the Seleucid Empire after his death. The Parni tribe took the city around 237 BCE and made it one of the first capitals of their Parthian Empire. It was mentioned as the royal city of the Parthians by a number of classical writers including Strabo, Pliny, and Ptolemy, although the Parthians seemed to have used a number of cities as their "capital" at different periods.

Qumis was destroyed by an earthquake in 856 AD, and it was probably abandoned afterwards. The site of this ancient city is now called Šahr-e Qumis, between Semnan and Damqan in the Semnan Province.

In 2011 plans for an "International Project of Tourism & Recreational City" were published, using the name of Hecatompylos.

Citations

References
 De Quincey, Thomas (1821). Confessions of an English Opium-Eater. Penguin Books. 1979.
 Frye, Richard N. (1962). The Heritage of Persia. Toronto. Mentor Books. 1966.
 Goodarzi, P., Dehpahlavan, M., Sołtysiak, A. (2018). "Human remains from Shahr-i Qumis, Iran, 1967-1978", Bioarchaeology of the Near East 12:89-94.
 Hansman, J. (1968). "The Problems of Qūmis". Journal of the Royal Asiatic Society (1968), pp. 111–139.
 Hansman, John and Stronach, David (1974). "Excavations at Shahr-i Qūmis, 1971". Journal of the Royal Asiatic Society (1974), pp. 8–22.
 Hirth, Friedrich (1875). China and the Roman Orient. Shanghai and Hong Kong. Unchanged reprint. Chicago, Ares Publishers, 1975.
 Tarn, William Woodthorpe (1984). The Greeks in Bactria and India. First published in 1938; 2nd Updated Edition, 1951. 3rd Edition, updated with a Preface and a new bibliography by Frank Lee Holt. Ares Publishers, Inc., Chicago. 1984.

External links
Magiran.com, a magazine named Qumis 
Livius.org, a brief history plus photos

Populated places along the Silk Road
Former populated places in Iran
Former capitals of Iran
Parthian cities
Sasanian cities
Geography of Semnan Province
History of Semnan Province
Cities destroyed by earthquakes
Qumis (region)